Scotland is a country that is part of the United Kingdom and covers the northern third of the island of Great Britain. Traditionally, the Scottish economy has been dominated by heavy industry underpinned by shipbuilding in Glasgow, coal mining and steel industries. Petroleum related industries associated with the extraction of North Sea oil have also been important employers from the 1970s, especially in the north-east of Scotland. Edinburgh is the financial services centre of Scotland, with many large finance firms based there, including: Lloyds Banking Group (owners of HBOS); the Government owned Royal Bank of Scotland and Standard Life.

Notable firms 
This list includes notable companies with primary headquarters located in the country. The industry and sector follow the Industry Classification Benchmark taxonomy. Organizations which have ceased operations are included and noted as defunct.

The list includes notable companies as defined under the Companies Act 1985 and the Companies Act 2006, as well as other bodies such as limited liability partnerships and building societies.

See also 

 Economy of Scotland
 List of restaurants in Scotland
 List of Scotland–based production companies
 Media in Scotland

References

External links
The Scotsman Business 250 (2005), The Scotsman
SCOTBIS, the Scottish Business Information Service, part of the National Library of Scotland

 
Companies
Scotland